Li Shoumin (1902–1961), better known by his pen name Huanzhulouzhu, was a Chinese wuxia and xianxia writer.

His 1946 novel Blades from the Willows, a prequel of his magnum opus Legend of the Swordsmen of the Mountains of Shu, was one of the first wuxia novels translated into English. Other wuxia writers whose novels were also among the first translated into English include Wang Dulu, Gong Baiyu, Zheng Zhengyin, and Zhu Zhenmu.

In other Media

Some of the films and TV series based on his novels are:
Zu: Warriors from the Magic Mountain (1983 Hong Kong film)
The Gods and Demons of Zu Mountain (1990 Hong Kong TV series)
The Zu Mountain Saga (1991 Hong Kong TV series)
The Legend of Zu (2001 Hong Kong film)
Legend of Zu Mountain (2015 Chinese TV series)

Works in English translation

See also 

 Wang Dulu
 Gong Baiyu

References

1902 births
1961 deaths
Chinese male novelists
20th-century Chinese novelists
Writers from Chongqing
Wuxia writers